The 2009–10 Vermont Catamounts women's ice hockey season was coached by head coach Tim Bothwell, assisted by Grant Kimball and Mike Gilligan. The athletic trainer was Grant Wilson, and the strength & conditioning coach was Justin Goulet.

Offseason
 Grant Kimball was hired to become the associate head coach for the University of Vermont women's hockey coaching staff. Kimball, a native of Harvard, Mass., came to Vermont after two seasons as an assistant coach with the University of North Dakota women's hockey program.

Exhibition

Regular season

Standings

Roster

Schedule

Player stats

Skaters

Goaltenders

Awards and honors
A Hockey East leading 13 Catamounts were named to the Hockey East All-Academic team
Chelsea Furlani was named one of four WHEA Top Scholar-Athletes  
Furlani and Kristen Olychuck were both named to the Hockey East Academic All-Star Team

Team records
Team Single Season Record, Most Games Won, Division I, 10, 2009–10
Team Single Season Record, Most Games Won, Hockey East, 5, 2009–10
Team Single Season Record, Most Games Won, Home, 7, (2009–10)
Individual Single Game Record, Most Assists, 3, Maggie Walsh, at Boston College (11/7/09)
Individual Single Season Record, Most Power Play Goals, 7, Kailey nash (2009–10)

References

External links
Official site

Vermont
Vermont Catamounts women's ice hockey seasons
Cata
Cata